Kayla Sauvao (born 12 May 1998) is an Australian rugby league footballer who plays as a  for the New Zealand Warriors in the NRL Women's Premiership and Wentworthville Magpies in the NSWRL Women's Premiership.

Before switching to rugby league, she represented Australia in rugby union.

Background
Sauvao was born in Otahuhu, Auckland, before moving to Australia, where she played rugby union for the Parramatta Two Blues.

Playing career

Rugby union
In 2017, Sauvao represented Australia at the 2017 Women's Rugby World Cup in Ireland.

Rugby league
In 2020, Sauvao switched to rugby league, joining the Wentworthville Magpies in the NSWRL Women's Premiership.

In September 2020, she joined the New Zealand Warriors NRL Women's Premiership team. In Round 1 of the 2020 NRLW season, she made her debut for the Warriors, starting at prop in their 28–14 loss to the Brisbane Broncos.

References

External links
New Zealand Warriors profile

1998 births
Living people
Australian female rugby union players
Australia women's international rugby union players
Rugby union centres
New Zealand female rugby league players
Rugby league props
New Zealand Warriors (NRLW) players
20th-century Australian women
21st-century Australian women